Braathens Regional Airways AB (previously Golden Air and Braathens Regional) is a Norwegian-owned Swedish airline with its head office in Trollhättan. It operates ACMI services between several domestic destinations within Sweden for its sister company and virtual airline BRA Braathens Regional Airlines and ad hoc charter services.

History 
The airline was originally registered as Golden Air Flyg AB in September 1976 and operated air taxi and charter services. It underwent several changes until being restructured under the current ownership in August 1993. It started operations on 15 August 1993. It was long wholly owned by shipping company Erik Thun and had 56 employees (at March 2007).

In 2012, Golden Air was acquired by Braathens Aviation and the main Trollhättan - Bromma route was taken over by Sverigeflyg. On 1 January 2013, Golden Air changed its name to Braathens Regional while retaining the brand name for its Bromma route.

In March 2016, Braathens Regional changed its name to Braathens Regional Airways and together with Braathens Regional Aviation started operating all flights for the virtual airline BRA Braathens Regional Airlines uniting the previously separated brands of Malmö Aviation and Sverigeflyg.

Braathens Regional Airways has one maintenance base at Ängelholm–Helsingborg Airport for the ATR 72 and one base at Umeå Airport for the SAAB 2000.

Destinations 
The airline does not have any destinations of its own but instead serves the destinations of its sister company BRA Braathens Regional Airlines.

Fleet

As of September 2022, the Braathens Regional Airlines fleet consists of the following aircraft:

See also
 Airlines
 Transport in Sweden

References

External links 

 

Airlines of Sweden
Airlines established in 1976
European Regions Airline Association
Companies based in Västra Götaland County
Norwegian companies established in 1976
Swedish companies established in 1976